VfR Wormatia 08 Worms is a German association football club that plays in Worms, Rhineland-Palatinate. The club and its historical predecessors were regular participants in regional first-division football competition until the formation of the national top-flight Bundesliga in 1963.

History

SC Wormatia was formed on 23 May 1908 and renamed VfL Wormatia Worms in 1921 just before merging with VfR Wormatia Worms in 1922. VfR was the product of the 1919 merger of Union 08 and Viktoria 1912. Both VfL and VfR were playing in the Kreisliga Hessen (I).

The combined side played in the Bezirksliga Rheinhessen-Saar earning mid-table results. In 1927, SC joined the Bezirksliga Main-Hessen and enjoyed first- and second-place finishes in that league's Gruppe Hessen. German football was re-organized under the Third Reich into sixteen Gauligen, or regional upper class leagues, in 1933. Wormatia found themselves playing in the Gauliga Südwest (I) where they continued to play well, capturing the division title three times. The side was merged into Reichsbahn TuSV Worms in 1938 and then played on under that name. The Gauliga Südwest was broken up into a two divisions in 1941 and the club went to the Gauliga Hessen-Nassau, playing there for only a couple of seasons before the end of World War II and the collapse of league play.

The club re-emerged as VfR Wormatia Worms after the war and joined the Oberliga Südwest (I) earning finishes in the upper half of the table in its first decade of play there, but only once advancing into the national championship rounds. That performance slipped somewhat in the years leading up to the formation of the Bundesliga, Germany's first professional league, in 1963. In the late 1960s, Wormatia became one of the first clubs to display advertising on its jerseys. Wormatia was seeded into the second division Regionalliga Südwest (2. Bundesliga after 1973) where, except for two seasons in the mid-1970s, the club played until 1981. The club's best results came in 1965, when it finished second and played in the Bundesliga promotion rounds, and in 1979, when it earned a third-place finish in the 2. Bundesliga.

The 1979 season was full of drama for Wormatia. At the mid-way point of the season the side led the 2.Bundesliga Süd as the Herbstmeisterschaft, or Autumn champions. Their second round German Cup match against Hertha BSC Berlin was called at 1–1 when the lights in Berlin's Olympiastadion failed and Worms then lost the subsequent re-match 0–2. The league championship remained within the club's grasp almost to the last, but crucial points were lost in drawing two of the season's final three matches. All of this took place against a background of steadily growing financial problems.

After struggling to avoid relegation through several poor seasons, the team finally slipped to the tier III Amateur Oberliga Südwest in 1982. A return to the 2. Bundesliga after a first-place finish in 1986 was frustrated when the club was denied a license because of its weak financial state. Wormatia continued to play third-division football until another financial crisis in 1994 drove them down to the Verbandsliga Südwest (V). The team returned to the Oberliga Südwest (IV) in 1998 and played there until 2008, when it qualified for the new Regionalliga West (IV) formed after the introduction of the 3. Liga. Finishing in the relegation zone at the end of its first season there, the club was saved from being sent down by the withdrawal of 12th-placed FSV Oggersheim from the league. Worms improved the following year and was moved to the Regionalliga Süd (IV) from 2010 to 2012. At the end of the 2011–12 season the club became part of the new Regionalliga Südwest (IV). They finished in a relegation position in 2014 but were spared from dropping back down to the Oberliga by the insolvency of SSV Ulm, but were relegated in 2019.

Honours
The club's honours:

League
 Bezirksliga Main-Hessen (I)
 Champions: 1928, 1929, 1930, 1931
 Gauliga Südwest/Mainhessen (I)
 Champions: 1936, 1937, 1939
 Oberliga Südwest (I)
 Runners-up: 1947, 1949, 1950, 1951, 1955
 Regionalliga Südwest (II)
 Runners-up: 1965
 Oberliga Südwest (III)
 Champions: 1986
 Amateurliga Südwest (III)
 Champions: 1976, 1977
 Verbandsliga Südwest (V)
 Champions: 1998

Cup
 South West Cup (Tiers III-VII)
 Winners: 1976, 1988, 1992, 2007, 2009, 2012, 2018

Current squad

Recent seasons
The recent season-by-season performance of the club:

 With the introduction of the Regionalligas in 1994 and the 3. Liga in 2008 as the new third tier, below the 2. Bundesliga, all leagues below dropped one tier.

Key

Former coaches
The managers of the club:

References

External links
Official website 
The Abseits Guide to German Soccer
Das deutsche Fußball-Archiv historical German domestic league tables 
Wormatia Worms at Fussballdaten.de
Wormatia Worms at Weltfussball.de

 
Football clubs in Germany
Football clubs in Rhineland-Palatinate
Association football clubs established in 1922
1922 establishments in Germany
Worms, Germany
2. Bundesliga clubs